Chris Heath is a British writer who was a regular contributor to the popular English music magazine Smash Hits in the eighties and early nineties.

In the late eighties, he travelled with Pet Shop Boys on their first ever world tour and the result was the book entitled Literally, released in 1990. In 1993, he published Pet Shop Boys Versus America which was written as he accompanied them on a US tour. He wrote the liner notes to the 2001 reissues of the band's first six albums, and assisted in the compilation of additional songs for inclusion. Alongside Pet Shop Boys, he contributed to the commentary track on the 2003 PopArt DVD. He writes and edits the Pet Shop Boys' fan club magazine, also called Literally, and conducts an interview for each of their tour programmes.

He has been a staff writer at Details, Rolling Stone, and most recently, American GQ, for which he has interviewed and written profiles of many celebrities.

He is also the author of the best-selling biography of Robbie Williams, Feel (2004), and its follow-up, Reveal (2017).

References

Year of birth missing (living people)
Living people
British music journalists
Pet Shop Boys